The men's 3000 metres steeplechase event at the 2013 Summer Universiade was held on 8–11 July.

Medalists

Results

Heats
Qualification: First 4 in each heat (Q) and the next 4 fastest (q) qualified for the final.

Final

References 

3000
2013